General Jenkins may refer to:

Albert G. Jenkins (1830–1864), Confederate States Army brigadier general
David Jenkins (British Army officer) (born 1945), British Army major general
Gwyn Jenkins (fl. 2010s–2020s), Royal Marines major general
Harry W. Jenkins (fl. 1960s–1990s), U.S. Marine Corps major general
Micah Jenkins (1835–1864), Confederate States Army brigadier general
Reuben Ellis Jenkins (1896–1975), U.S. Army lieutenant general
Sean M. Jenkins (born 1966), U.S. Army major general

See also
Attorney General Jenkins (disambiguation)